Manase is a village in Samoa

Manase may also refer to:

Given name
 Manase Fainu, Tonga international rugby league footballer
 Manasé Bezara, Malagasy politician.
 Manase Manuokafoa, Tonga international rugby league footballer

Surname
 Juri Manase, Japanese actress
 Emmanuel Manase, South Sudanese footballer 

 Other
 Muddu Manase
 Manase Tonga
 Manase Mandiram
 Manase Ninakku Mangalam
 O Manase

See also 
 Manasses (disambiguation)